Gold Mask is an ongoing South Korean television series starring Cha Ye-ryun, Na Young-hee and Lee Hwi-hyang. It is about a tragedy occurs for three women, caused by greed and desire. The daily drama aired on KBS2 on May 23 to October 7, 2022, every weekday at 19:50 (KST) for 100 episodes.

Synopsis 
The drama tells the story of finding the answer to life in a mad fight between three women due to a tragedy caused by false desires and greed.

Cast

Main 
 Cha Ye-ryun as Yoo Soo-Yeon
 Grew up with ordinary parents, she falls in love with a man from a chaebol family and marries him. Her life seems to mirror that of Cinderella and she is envied by others, but her life isn't easy due to mistreatment from her in-laws.
 Na Young-hee as Cha Hwa-Young
 She is full of greed and desire, and tries to keep her upper class life.
 Lee Hwi-hyang as Go Mi-Sook
 She is a private moneylender and she owns a franchise restaurant chain. She is a good person.
 Lee Joong-moon as Hong Jin-woo 
 He is the son of Cha Hwa-Young, he is tricked by his mother into divorcing Soo-Yeon and into marrying Yoo-ra.
 Lee Hyun-jin as Kang Dong-ha 
 He is a director of a private investment company, he wants to avenge his father's death.
 Yeon Min-ji  as Seo Yoo-ra An evil and cunning designer who will become Soo-Yeon’s arch-nemesis. She killed Soo-Yeon’s father and will kill anyone who dares to stop her wicked plans.

Supporting 
 Sunwoo Eun-sook as Kim Hye-kyung 
 Yoo Su-yeon's mother.
 Jung Min-joon as Hong Seo-Jun
 Yoo Su-yeon's son to Jin-woo.
Gong Da-im as Hong Jin-ah 
An aristocratic who secretly has a crush on Kang Dong-ha, She is also Cha Hwa-yeong's arrogant and violent daughter.
 Lee Joo-eun as Noh Young-ji 
 the cousin of the Yoo Su-yeon, After a divorce from a violent husband, Lives with her aunt, Kim Hye Kyung.
 Hwang Dong-joo as Ko Dae-cheol 
Restaurant manager, But he has a remarkable history as a special forces soldier.
 Kim Ji-yoon as Lee Ji-eun
The butler in charge of the housekeeping of the SA group.

Production 
The series is directed by Io Soo Sun, who has worked on series such as Angel's Revenge (2014) and Gracious Revenge (2019). It is written by Kim Min Joo, who wrote the series Sunny Again Tomorrow (2018) I Wanna Hear Your Song (2019). It is planned by KBS Drama Department and produced by IWill Media.

Original soundtrack 
Part 1

Part 2

Part 3

Part 4

Part 5

Viewership

Note

References

External links 
  
 
 

Korean Broadcasting System television dramas
2022 South Korean television series debuts
2022 South Korean television series endings
Korean-language television shows
South Korean melodrama television series
Television series about revenge
Television series by IWill Media